Deng Zhaoxiang (April, 1903 – August 6, 1998) was a Chinese naval officer, who served as an Admiral under both the Republic of China and the People's Republic of China. After his retirement, he became Vice Chairman of the Chinese People's Political Consultative Conference.

Life
Born in Gaoyao, Guangdong, Deng Zhaoxiang successively studied in Wusong Naval Academy, Yantai Naval Academy , Nanjing Naval Torpedo Gun School and other naval schools. After graduating, he served in the Fourth Fleet of the Guangdong Navy and served as deputy department chief, department chief, deputy captain, and captain. In 1930, he went to study in the United Kingdom, at the Royal Naval College, Greenwich and the British Naval Torpedo School. 

After returning to China in 1934, he served successively as commander of a naval torpedo unit, staff officer at the second naval fleet command, and director of training at the Guizhou Tongzi Naval Academy. In 1945, he served as the captain of the Changzhi warship, and in 1948 as the captain of the largest cruiser Chongqing of the Republic of China Navy. 

In February 1949, Deng Zhaoxiang led the officers and sailors of the Chongqing to mutiny, defecting to the Chinese Communist Party. He was appointed by Mao Zedong as the captain of the cruiser Chongqing of the Chinese People's Liberation Army Navy, as well as principal of the An Donghai naval school.

After the founding of the People's Republic of China , Deng Zhaoxiang served as the principal of Qingdao Naval Speedboat School in 1950. In 1954, he was elected as a deputy to the first National People's Congress. In 1955, he served as the vice principal of the First Naval Academy and was awarded the rank of Rear Admiral in the same year. 

In 1956, he became deputy chief of staff of the Qingdao Base Command of the Navy, and was promoted to the deputy commander of the base the following year. In 1960, he served as deputy commander of the North Sea Fleet. 

Accepted as a member of the Chinese Communist Party in 1965. 

Eventually rose to deputy commander of the entire People's Liberation Army Navy. He retired in 1985 and served as Vice Chairman of the National Committee of the Chinese People's Political Consultative Conference. 

In 1988, he was awarded the Medal of Merit of the Chinese People's Liberation Army.

He died in Beijing on August 6, 1998.

References 

1903 births
1998 deaths
Vice Chairpersons of the National Committee of the Chinese People's Political Consultative Conference